Puck railway station is a railway station serving the town of Puck, in the Pomeranian Voivodeship, Poland. The station opened on 15 December 1898 and is located on the Reda–Hel railway. The train services are operated by Przewozy Regionalne.

History
The station and the town used to be known as Putzig.

In 1928 a new station was built.

On 26 September 1993 the last scheduled steam passenger train operated along the line.

In 1998 the line was modernised. Stations have been equipped with a remotely controlled traffic centre from Gdynia, so that the presence of service stations along the route (in addition to the ticket offices) have become redundant.

Train services
The station is served by the following services:

Regional services (R) Władysławowo - Reda - Gdynia Główna
Regional services (R) Hel - Władysławowo - Reda - Gdynia Główna

During the summer months long-distance services also operate to/from Hel.

References 

 This article is based upon a translation of the Polish language version as of September 2016.

External links

Railway stations in Poland opened in 1898
Railway stations in Pomeranian Voivodeship
Puck County